Gyeongju Sol clan is a Korean clan. Their Bon-gwan is in Gyeongju, North Gyeongsang Province. , the clan had a membership of 3269 people. That clan had an ancestor who was the Uyghur Khaganate's Finance Minister. They were naturalized in Goryeo, so as to not get involved with the Red Turban Rebellion. Their clan's name, "Sol" (偰) originated from the fact that its ancestors lived on the Xueyanhe River (偰輦河江).

See also 
 Korean clan names of foreign origin

References

External links 
 

 
Uyghur Khaganate
Seol clans
Korean people of Uyghur descent